Eisner Food Stores was a chain of supermarkets in Illinois and Indiana. It was acquired by The Jewel Companies, Inc. in 1957. The  Eisner stores were rebranded as Jewel in 1985.

History
Albert Eisner, Sr. (1851-1926), a Hungarian immigrant, incorporated Eisner Grocery Company in June 1906 in Champaign, Illinois. In 1919, he entered into a franchise agreement with Piggly Wiggly, the first self-serve grocery store, and opened a few Piggly Wiggly locations in Champaign and the surrounding areas. Those stores would later rebrand to Eisner stores when the franchise agreement was ended in 1951 by his son, Albert Eisner, Jr. (1885-1980). Eisner, Jr. took over after his father's death in 1926, and by the 1950s, Eisner Grocery Company had more than 40 supermarkets in downstate Illinois and Western Indiana.

Acquisition by Jewel
In 1957, The Jewel Companies, Inc. acquired Eisner Food Stores with its 41 stores in Illinois and Indiana. Eisner continued to be managed from Champaign, Illinois. Within a few years, the Eisner stores began to closely resemble Jewel in both appearance and marketing strategies.

Eisner-Osco Family Centers
In Indianapolis, Eisner opened the first two Eisner Food-Osco Drug Family Shopping Centers in 1972 in which an Eisner Food and an Osco Drug are placed side-by-side underneath a single roof and separate by a partial wall.

Following the acquisition by Jewel, most Eisner stores were remodeled into Eisner-Osco stores, which combined the products sold by Eisner and Osco Drug. The new stores included common checkout stands but separate store management, all under one roof.

Turn-Style/Eisner Family Centers
In Indianapolis, Jewel opened three Turn-Style/Eisner Family Centers in late 1970 that combined the two stores under one roof. This concept did not last very long and the three Indianapolis family centers were converted into Osco Drug stores in 1977.

Big E Warehouse Foods
In 1977, Eisner created a warehouse store chain called Big E Warehouse Foods which sold food and other items at deep discounts. This money-losing experiment did not last very long. In Indianapolis, Eisner sold five out of eight Big E stores to rival Preston-Safeway while closing the remain three stores in 1983.

Demise of the Eisner brand
In 1984, Eisner's parent, the Jewel Companies was unable to defend itself from a very expensive hostile takeover by American Stores. After the takeover, American Stores decided to save money by merging Eisner directly into Jewel, converting all stores to the Jewel name, and slowly started to sell off the former Eisner properties. One of the first properties to let go was the former Eisner warehouse facility in Champaign in 1986. With the Champaign warehouse facility gone, many former Eisner locations became less profitable since they had to be serviced from the more distant Jewel warehouse at Melrose Park, justifying the elimination of those locations. The west central Indiana stores, three in Lafayette and two in Bloomington, were sold off in 1990. Jewel also closed central Illinois locations that were formerly Eisner in Decatur (in 1995), Champaign-Urbana (in 1998), and Springfield (2006).

Eisner Park
In 1944, the Eisner family donated 4-acres of land to the city of Champaign for use as a park. The park was later renamed Eisner Park in their honor.

See also
 Jewel Food Stores
 Osco Drug
 Turn Style

References

Defunct supermarkets of the United States
Defunct companies based in Chicago
Retail companies established in 1901
Retail companies disestablished in 1981
1901 establishments in Illinois